St. Charles Community Schools (STCCS) is a school district headquartered in St. Charles, Michigan. It is a part of the Saginaw Intermediate School District and serves the St. Charles area, including the village of St. Charles, the northern portions of Brant and St. Charles townships, and the southern portions of Fremont and Swan Creek townships. Its schools include St. Charles Elementary School, Anna M. Thurston Middle School, and St. Charles Community High School.

References

External links

 St. Charles Community Schools

School districts in Michigan
Saginaw Intermediate School District